The Brooks Tower is a 42-story residential skyscraper in downtown Denver, Colorado, United States. At the time of its construction in 1968, it was the tallest building in Denver, standing . In 2021, it is the fifteenth-largest building in Denver. It was also Denver's first high-rise residential building. Brooks Tower was converted to condominiums in the 1995.

References

 

Residential buildings completed in 1968
Residential skyscrapers in Denver
Residential condominiums in the United States